Charles Francis Chidsey was an American politician who served as the first mayor of Easton, Pennsylvania from 1887 to 1890 as well as a Pennsylvania House Representative from 1896 to 1898.

Early life

Chidsey graduated Lafayette College in 1864 and was a veteran of the American Civil War serving as a private in the 129th Pennsylvania Infantry Regiment and as a first lieutenant for the 38th Regiment of the Pennsylvania Emergency Militia.

Career

Early career

Following the end of the civil war Chidsey pursued a career in rail and heavy industry. He worked as a clerk in the Chicago and Northwestern Railway, as secretary of the Warren Foundry and Machine Company, and finally as president of the Eastern Railroad Company.

He first got involved in politics when he was elected the president of the Easton school board, an office he would hold from 1876 through 1877. He was then appointed as the county prison inspector by the Northampton County executive, and held that office from 1881 to 1886. During this period he was also first elected to then borough council of Easton and would hold office from 1883 to 1886. He was also elected as an alternate delegate for the 1884 Republican National Convention and unsuccessfully ran for a seat in the House the same year.

Mayor of Easton

Following his time as a councilor, Chidsey was elected the first mayor of Easton in February 1887, taking office on April 4, 1887. He transformed the former Borough's police, fire and electric light departments to enhance their performance and better serve the people of Easton. The department to get the largest reform would be the police which was entirely remodeled and given uniforms. He was mayor during the Great Blizzard of 1888 which saw Easton cut off from the outside world. Additionally his mayorship was engaged in a heated legal debate with the descendants of William Penn over the ownership of the old court house at Centre Circle, with the city prevailing. He constructed a memorial arch to the memory of Governor George Wolf and sought to turn Easton into a manufacturing hub by giving loans with minimal interest to industrial firms. He did not seek a second term with his term expiring in 1890.

Post Mayoral career

After leaving office Chidsey successfully sought election to the Pennsylvania House of Representatives in 1896. He did not seek re-election and his term expired in 1898. He ran unsuccessfully for a seat in the Pennsylvania State Senate in 1906. He also unsuccessfully ran for Lieutenant Governor of Pennsylvania in 1910, losing the Republican Primary to John Merriman Reynolds. He would be elected as one of the first Easton City Commissioners, and hold office from 1913 to 1916, not seeking re-election.

His last public appearance was at a Christmas Banquet for Union Veterans from Easton in 1931. He would die shortly after his 89th Birthday on January 11, 1933, and is buried in Easton Cemetery.

References

Mayors of Easton, Pennsylvania
Lafayette College alumni
1843 births
1933 deaths